Jeff Jacques (born April 4, 1953) is a Canadian former professional ice hockey winger who played 201 games in the World Hockey Association. He was a member of the Birmingham Bulls and Toronto Toros.

Career statistics

References

External links
 

1953 births
Birmingham Bulls players
California Golden Seals draft picks
Canadian ice hockey right wingers
Jacksonville Barons players
Living people
Mohawk Valley Comets (NAHL) players
St. Catharines Black Hawks players
Toronto Toros players
Winnipeg Jets (WHA) draft picks